Phaius tankervilleae, commonly known as the greater swamp-orchid, swamp lily, swamp orchid, nun's-hood orchid, nun's orchid, veiled orchid, Lady Tankerville's swamp orchid or 鹤顶兰 (he ding lan), is a species of orchid native to areas from Asia to islands in the Pacific Ocean. It has large, pleated leaves and tall flowering stems bearing up to twenty five white, brown, mauve and yellow flowers. It was named for Lady Tankerville who was the first person to make the orchid flower successfully in England. It was the first tropical orchid to flower in England.

Description
The flowers are whitish on the outside and reddish brown inside. The middle lobe is more or less tube-shaped and the side lobes have wavy or crinkled edges. Flowering occurs from September to November in Australia and from March to June in Asia.

Taxonomy and naming
In 1778, John Fothergill sent specimens of this orchid back from China to England and in 1788, after one had flowered, Joseph Banks formally described the species, giving it the name Limodorum tankervilleae. In 1859, Carl Ludwig Blume changed the name to Phaius tankervilleae. The specific epithet (tankervilleae) honours Lady Emma Tankerville, as the orchid had flowered in her greenhouse at Walton-on-Thames near London. It was the first tropical orchid to flower in England. 

Other spellings of the specific epithet are sometimes used. When Charles Louis L'Héritier de Brutelle published his book Sertum Anglicum and cited Joseph Banks' name for this species, he Latinised it to Limodorum tancarvilleae. As a result, some authorities, including the Australian Plant Census, list the species as Phaius tancervilleae. The spellings P. tankervilliae and P. tankarvilliae have also been used.

In 2017, Judi Stone and Phillip James Cribb published a monograph entitled Lady Tankerville's Legacy - A Historical and Monographic Review of Phaius and Gastrorchis, in which they described six varieties of Phaius tankervilleae:
 Phaius tankervilleae var. antoninae (P.Balzer) J.V.Stone & P.J.Cribb (2017)
 Phaius tankervilleae var. australis (F.Muell.) J.V.Stone & P.J.Cribb (2017)
 Phaius tankervilleae var. baolocensis (Duy, Tao Chen & D.X.Zhang) J.V.Stone & P.J.Cribb (2017)
 Phaius tankervilleae var. bernaysii (F.Muell. ex Rchb.f.) J.V.Stone & P.J.Cribb (2017)
 Phaius tankervilleae var. devogelii J.V.Stone & P.J.Cribb (2017)
 Phaius tankervilleae var. tankervilleae

Distribution and habitat
Phaius tankervilleae grows in swampy forest or grassland. It is found in the Indian Subcontinent, New Guinea, China, Japan, Southeast Asia, Indonesia, Malaysia, the Philippines, Australia and certain islands of the Pacific. It is also naturalised in Hawaii, Panama, the West Indies and Florida.

In Australia it is found as P. tankervilleae var. australis as far south as Yamba, New South Wales. and further north in tropical Queensland. While rare in parts of its native habitat, it is present in other parts of the world as a naturalised species, including Hawaii<ref>USFWS. [http://ecos.fws.gov/docs/five_year_review/doc3302.pdf Cyanea remyi Five-year Review.] August 2010. pg 4.</ref> and Florida.

Conservation statusPhaius tankervilleae var. australis, as Phaius australis, is listed as endangered with possible extinction within the country. It is threatened by trampling by stock, and by illegal collecting, weeds and drainage of its habitat.

Use in horticulture
Identification of the genus Phaius is a particularly challenging and difficult task. Many plants are incorrectly labeled in nurseries or misidentified by professionals and authors. An easily grown plant in cultivation. It prefers semi shade. Propagation is achieved from seed or by the cutting of the base clump of the plant. The large flowers occur in spring. Also, flower stem node propagation brings success. Where after flowering, the scape is either laid whole or in sections on a medium such as Sphagnum'' moss or stood in a container of water. Plantlets emerge from the nodes, and when large enough are removed and potted up.

Gallery

References

External links
 
 Flora 33 - Phaius Tankervilleae (Phaius tancarvilleae)
 

tankervilleae
Orchids of Asia
Orchids of Oceania
Orchids of Malaya
Orchids of China
Orchids of India
Orchids of Indonesia
Orchids of Malaysia
Orchids of New South Wales
Orchids of Queensland
Orchids of New Guinea